Letty Lynton is a 1931 novel by the British writer Marie Belloc Lowndes. It is loosely inspired by the case of Madeleine Smith, a young woman accused of murder.

Adaptation
In 1932 it was adapted by Hollywood studio MGM into the film Letty Lynton directed by Clarence Brown and starring Joan Crawford, Robert Montgomery and Nils Asther.

References

Bibliography
 Goble, Alan. The Complete Index to Literary Sources in Film. Walter de Gruyter, 1999.
 Vinson, James. Twentieth-Century Romance and Gothic Writers. Macmillan, 1982.

1931 British novels
Novels by Marie Belloc Lowndes
British novels adapted into films
Heinemann (publisher) books